Antedating may refer to:
 Antedating (lexicography), finding attested use of a word or phrase earlier than the previous earliest known use
 Antedated contract, takes effect earlier than its signing date
 Antedated cheque, dated earlier than its date of signing

See also
 Backdating
 Chronological dating